Dean Crombie (born 9 August 1957) is an English former professional footballer.

Playing career
Crombie came through the youth ranks of local side Lincoln United and played Sunday football for Adelaide Park also playing for Lincoln City juniors and Ruston Bucyrus first team before joining Lincoln City, managed by Graham Taylor, in 1977 as a professional player. He later transferred to Grimsby Town where he spent nine years as a regular player in the first team winning a promotion and a championship with Grimsby. After leaving Grimsby in 1987 he was signed by Bolton Wanderers managed by Phil Neal gaining promotion and scoring at Wembley in the Sherpa Van final with Bolton winning 4–1 he finished his career with Bolton Wanderers, in 1991 although he did have a brief spell as Assistant player manager at Lincoln City where he made one appearance before returning to Bolton to take up a coaching position.

Coaching career
After a long playing career Crombie continued to work for several years at Bolton Wanderers taking up a number of positions within the club initially as youth coach before moving into a senior coaching position with the 1st team and then taking on the role of chief scout. He then left Bolton to become a football agent for 2 years before returning to Bolton to recruit players for the Academy. He then moved to Wigan Athletic as the Centre of Excellence Manager. Crombie returned to Bolton after 3 years at Wigan to take up the role of Head of Academy Recruitment where he spent a further 6 years before he left the role in 2014. He rejoined Wigan Athletic on a part time basis where he became a scout reporting mainly on up and coming opposition, after spending a further four years at Wigan he joined Sunderland FC in similar role where he spent the next two years.

Honours

Grimsby Town
Supporters Player of the Season: 1980
3rd Division Champions

Bolton Wanderers
Football League Trophy: Winners, 1989
Player of the year 1989

References

External links
 Dean Crombie's profile at Burnden Aces.
 

English footballers
English Football League players
Lincoln City F.C. players
1957 births
Living people
Grimsby Town F.C. players
Bolton Wanderers F.C. players
Lincoln City F.C. non-playing staff
Bolton Wanderers F.C. non-playing staff
Wigan Athletic F.C. non-playing staff
Association football defenders